Maxwell McCormick (born May 1, 1992) is an American professional ice hockey forward who is currently playing for the Coachella Valley Firebirds in the American Hockey League (AHL) while under contract to the Seattle Kraken in the National Hockey League (NHL). McCormick was selected 171st overall in the 2011 NHL Entry Draft by the Ottawa Senators.

Playing career

McCormick grew up in the Green Bay area where  he played junior hockey for Notre Dame Academy before moving to the Sioux City Musketeers of the United States Hockey League. He was selected by the Ottawa Senators in the sixth round of the 2011 NHL Entry Draft. He then committed to a collegiate career attending Ohio State University for three years. On May 28, 2014, he was signed to a two-year entry-level contract with the Senators.

McCormick turned professional in 2014 with the Binghamton Senators of the American Hockey League (AHL). McCormick made his NHL debut on October 25, 2015 with Ottawa in a 4–1 defeat to the Arizona Coyotes.

On February 6, 2019, McCormick was traded to the Colorado Avalanche in exchange for J.C. Beaudin. He was immediately assigned to the team's American League affiliate, the Colorado Eagles. McCormick played out the remainder of the 2018–19 season with the Eagles, adding 8 points in 25 regular season games. Helping the Eagles to the 2019 Calder Cup playoffs, he made two post-season appearances.

As a free agent from his brief tenure with the Avalanche, McCormick was signed to a one-year, two-way contract with the Carolina Hurricanes on July 25, 2019. In the following 2019–20 season, McCormick returning from injury was belatedly assigned by the Hurricanes to AHL affiliate, the Charlotte Checkers. Among the Checkers scoring lines, McCormick collected 16 goals and 35 points in 56 games before the remainder of the season was cancelled due to the COVID-19 pandemic.

On October 28, 2020, McCormick as a free agent remained with the Hurricanes, signing a one-year, two-way contract extension.

Career statistics

References

External links

1992 births
Living people
Belleville Senators players
Binghamton Senators players
Carolina Hurricanes players
Charlotte Checkers (2010–) players
Chicago Wolves players
Coachella Valley Firebirds players
Colorado Eagles players
Ohio State Buckeyes men's ice hockey players
Ottawa Senators draft picks
Ottawa Senators players
Seattle Kraken players
Sioux City Musketeers players
American men's ice hockey forwards
Ice hockey players from Wisconsin
People from Antigo, Wisconsin
Notre Dame Academy (Green Bay, Wisconsin) alumni